The 331st Fighter-Interceptor Squadron is an inactive United States Air Force unit.  Its last assignment was with Air Defense Command at Webb Air Force Base, Texas, where it was inactivated on 1 March 1967.

During World War II the squadron was a Lockheed P-38 Lightning replacement training unit on the west coast of the United States.  It performed this mission until it was disbanded in 1944 in a major reorganization of Army Air Forces training and support units.

The squadron was reactivated in 1953 as part of the expansion on air defenses and served in this role from bases in New York until 1958, when it moved to Texas.  In Texas it assumed the additional mission of combat crew training for Lockheed F-104 Starfighter pilots.

History

World War II
The squadron was first activated in 1942 as the 331st Fighter Squadron, one of the three original squadrons of the 329th Fighter Group. The squadron served under IV Fighter Command as a Lockheed P-38 Lightning Replacement Training Unit. Replacement training units were oversized units which trained aircrews prior to their deployment to combat theaters. It trained P-38 pilots in California and Washington State. However, the Army Air Forces found that standard military units, based on relatively inflexible tables of organization were proving less well adapted to the training mission.  Accordingly, a more functional system was adopted in which each base was organized into a separate numbered unit. This resulted in the 331st, along with other units at Ellensburg Army Airfield, being disbanded in the spring of 1944 and replaced by an Army Air Forces Base Unit.

Cold War Air Defense

The 331st was reconstituted as the 331st Fighter-Interceptor Squadron and activated in 1953 at Suffolk County Air Force Base as an Air Defense Command (ADC) interceptor squadron. The squadron was initially equipped with radar equipped and Mighty Mouse rocket armed North American F-86D Sabres. In the summer of 1955 ADC implemented Project Arrow, which was designed to bring back on the active list the fighter units which had compiled memorable records in the two world wars. As part of this reorganization, the 331st's World War II headquarters, the 329th Fighter Group, was reactivated at Stewart Air Force Base. The squadron moved to Stewart on paper, and assumed the mission, personnel and F-86D aircraft of the 539th Fighter-Interceptor Squadron.   In December 1956, the squadron began to receive upgraded F-86L Sabres equipped with data link communications equipment to interface with the Semi Automatic Ground Environment (SAGE) air defense system.

In 1958, the 331st returned to flying F-86Ds and moved to Webb AFB, Texas for air defense of south central United States.  It reequipped with Convair F-102 Delta Daggers in 1960. At the beginning of the Cuban Missile Crisis on 22 October 1962, the squadron deployed eighteen F-102s to Homestead Air Force Base, Florida. These planes were soon replaced by planes from the 325th Fighter-Interceptor Squadron.  Truax's F-102s were the only Delta Daggers in ADC that had not been modified to carry the nuclear armed GAR-11 Falcon and were more suited to the Homestead mission.

In 1963 the squadron received Lockheed F-104 Starfighters that had been assigned to the Air National Guard. Although the F-104A had been withdrawn from active service in 1960 because its fire control system was not compatible with the SAGE system, this did not affect the squadron while it operated from Webb, because the 4752d Air Defense Wing operated a manual NORAD Sector Combat Center.  In addition to single-seat F-104As, the squadron received the two-seat, dual-control, combat trainer F-104B. The performance of the F-104B was almost identical to that of the F-104A, but the lower internal fuel capacity reduced its effective range considerably.  The squadron served as the ADC combat crew training squadron for the F-104.

In May 1965, in connection with the United States intervention in the Dominican Civil War, the squadron deployed twelve F-104s to Ramey Air Force Base, Puerto Rico to help prevent Cuban intervention in the Dominican Republic. The squadron continued to fly F-104s until it was inactivated in 1967 and its personnel and F-104s transferred to the 4760th Combat Crew Training Squadron, which assumed the F-104 training mission for Royal Jordanian Air Force F-104 pilots. The 4760th was discontinued on 1 October 1967 when the Jordanian pilots were recalled because of the war with Israel.

Lineage
 Constituted as the 331st Fighter Squadron on 24 June 1942
 Activated on 10 July 1942
 Disbanded on 31 March 1944
 Reconstituted and redesignated 331st Fighter-Interceptor Squadron, on 3 February 1953
 Activated on 24 February 1953
 Inactivated 1 March 1967

Assignments
 329th Fighter Group, 10 July 1942 – 31 March 1944
 519th Air Defense Group, 24 February 1953
 329th Fighter Group, 18 August 1955
 33d Air Division, 15 August 1958
 Albuquerque Air Defense Sector, 1 January 1960
 Oklahoma City Air Defense Sector, 15 September 1960
 4752d Air Defense Wing, 1 September 1961 – 1 March 1967

Stations

 Hamilton Field, California, 10 July 1942
 Paine Field, Washington, 14 July 1942
 Mines Field, California, 10 September 1942
 Van Nuys Army Air Field, California, 4 November 1942
 Olympia Army Air Field, Washington, 13 August 1943;

 Ellensburg Army Airfield, Washington, 1 November 1943
 Ontario Army Air Field, California, 27 December 1943 – 31 March 1944
 Suffolk County AFB, New York, 24 February 1953
 Stewart AFB, New York, 18 August 1955
 Webb AFB, Texas, 15 August 1958 – 1 March 1967

Aircraft

 Lockheed P-38 Lightning, 1942–1944
 North American F-51 Mustang, 1953
 North American F-86D Sabre, 1953–1956, 1958–1960
 North American F-86L Sabre, 1956–1958
 Convair F-102 Delta Dagger, 1960–1963
 Lockheed F-104 Starfighter, 1963–1967

See also

 List of United States Air Force Aerospace Defense Command Interceptor Squadrons
 List of F-86 Sabre units
 List of Lockheed F-104 Starfighter operators

References

Notes

Bibliography

 Buss, Lydus H.(ed), Sturm, Thomas A., Volan, Denys, and McMullen, Richard F., History of Continental Air Defense Command and Air Defense Command July to December 1955, Directorate of Historical Services, Air Defense Command, Ent AFB, CO, (1956)
 
 
 
 
 
 McMullen, Richard F. (1964) "The Fighter Interceptor Force 1962–1964"  ADC Historical Study No. 27, Air Defense Command, Ent Air Force Base, CO (Confidential, declassified 22 March 2000)
 NORAD/CONAD Participation in the Cuban Missile Crisis, Historical Reference Paper No. 8, Directorate of Command History Continental Air Defense Command, Ent AFB, CO, 1 Feb 63 (Top Secret NOFORN declassified 9 March 1996)
 "ADCOM's Fighter Interceptor Squadrons". The Interceptor (January 1979) Aerospace Defense Command, (Volume 21, Number 1)

External links

Fighter squadrons of the United States Air Force
Military units and formations established in 1953
Aerospace Defense Command units